Pine Lake, previously known as Laguna Puerca or Pig Lake, is a freshwater lake in Pine Lake Park in the southwest corner of San Francisco. The lake is fed from the same aquifer as nearby Lake Merced.

History 
The surrounding area and lake, then known as Laguna Puerca or Pig Lake, were purchased by the Greene family following their move from Maine to San Francisco in 1847. The lake was purchased by the City of San Francisco in the five years following the nearby Sigmund Stern Recreation Grove.

Ecology 
The lake is fed by an underground spring, which also feeds nearby Lake Merced. It is surrounded by willows, tules, and aquatic plants. Migratory birds along the Pacific Flyway stop to feed, rest, or inhabit the surrounding area. The only natural freshwater lakes in San Francisco are Pine Lake, Lake Merced, and Mountain Lake.

See also 
 List of lakes in California
 List of lakes in the San Francisco Bay Area

References

External links 

 Official website of Pine Lake Park

Lakes of the San Francisco Bay Area
Landmarks in San Francisco
Lakes of California
Lakes of San Francisco
Lakes of Northern California